Fairfield West is a suburb of Sydney, in the state of New South Wales, Australia. Fairfield West is located 27 kilometres west of the Sydney central business district in the local government area of the City of Fairfield. Fairfield West is part of the Greater Western Sydney region.

Fairfield West shares the postcode of 2165 with the separate suburbs of Fairfield, Fairfield Heights and Fairfield East.

History
When British settlers first arrived in Sydney, the area that is now known as Fairfield West was inhabited by the Cabrogal tribe. A railway station was built at neighbouring Fairfield in 1856 leading to substantial population growth around the station which eventually to Fairfield West being subdivided in the 1870s. At the time it was mostly small farms but a Progress Association was established leading to a post office, school and a sportsground being built in the community. Timber cutting became a significant local industry and the sawmills brought other businesses into the new town, which was well established by the end of the 1800s. Fairfield West Public School was built there in 1925.

Education 
Fairvale High School (abbreviated as FVHS) is a government-funded co-educational comprehensive secondary day school, located in Fairfield West.

Established in 1969, the school caters for approximately 1,500 students from Year 7 to Year 12. The school is operated by the New South Wales Department of Education within the part of the Fairfield school education area, in the Regional South district. Fairvale High School located in Fairfield West has an enrolment of 1500 students (co-educational and comprehensive), including 92% students from a Language Background other than English. The school has nine Special Education classes consisting of one Autism, three Mild Intellectual Disabilities, one Moderate Intellectual disability, two Behaviour disorder, one Emotional disturbance, and one Multi-Categorial class. The BD, ED and MC classes are situated off site at Canley Vale Tutorial Centre. There are 120 teachers, 30 administrative staff and three Deputy Principals.

Westfields Sports High School (abbreviated as WSHS) is a government-funded co-educational comprehensive and specialist secondary day school, with speciality in sports, located in Fairfield West, a western suburb of Sydney, New South Wales, Australia.

Established in 1963, the school caters for approximately 1,660 students in 2018, from Year 7 to Year 12, of whom three percent identified as Indigenous Australians and 66 percent were from a language background other than English.

Westfields Sports High School is a member of the NSW Sports High Schools Association. The school sits on a total area of approximately seven hectares (seventeen acres).

Recreational areas
The Endeavour Sports Reserve, located near Orphan School Creek, is a large floodlit urban park and a sports ground that features shared soccer, cricket, league and hockey fields, and four tennis courts. The vegetation along the creek side has been identified by the NSW National Parks and Wildlife Service as a Cumberland Plain Endangered Ecological Community. The narrow woodland strip, which border the creek, feature a walking/cycling path, and are dominated by Eucalyptus moluccana and Eucalyptus tereticornis trees. Although not in the suburb, Brenan Park is adjacent to the northeastern vicinity of Fairfield West.

Population
At the 2021 census, there were 12,981 residents in Fairfield West.

The most common ancestries were Vietnamese (17.7%), Assyrian (11.9%), Chinese (8.8%), Australian (8.4%) and English (8.4%).

38.1% of people were born in Australia. The next most common countries of birth were Iraq (18.0	%), Vietnam (12.7%),Syria (4.7%), Cambodia (2.9%) and Lebanon (1.3%).

In Fairfield West 23.0% of people spoke only English at home. Other languages spoken at home included Vietnamese (18.9%), Assyrian Neo-Aramaic (11.4%), Arabic (11.2%), Chaldean Neo-Aramaic (6.3%) and Spanish (3.0%). If the Assyrian and Chaldean varieties were combined, then Neo-Aramaic will be the second most common spoken language at 17.7%.

The top responses for religious affiliation were Catholic (35.1%), Buddhism (14.5%), No Religion (12.8%), Unstated (7.1%) and Assyrian Church of the East (6.0%). The majority of dwellings (88.3%) were separate houses, with the remainder of dwellings being semi-detached or townhouses.

Notable residents
 Vic Hey (1912-1995), member of the Australian Rugby League Hall of Fame.
 Maria Tran, actress and filmmaker who grew up as a resident and went to Fairfield West Public School from year 4–6.

References

Suburbs of Sydney
City of Fairfield